State Road 2 (AR 2, Ark. 2, and Hwy. 2) is a former east–west state highway in the Arkansas Timberlands and Lower Arkansas Delta. On July 1, 1931, the route was entirely replaced by US Highway 82 (US 82) by the American Association of State Highway Officials (AASHTO). The route was maintained by the Arkansas Highway Department (AHD), now known as the Arkansas Department of Transportation (ArDOT).

Except near cities, the current US 82 closely follows the original 1926 routing. One section of State Road 2 original pavement, known as the Old Arkansas 2-Mayton Segment, survives north of Garland. It was listed on the National Register of Historic Places on May 16, 2008.

Route description

The route served the southern tier of counties in Arkansas, connecting several cities of regional importance. State Road 2 connected six county seats and included three toll bridges. State Road 2 also provided an important connection between the Arkansas Timberlands, approximately the western half of its Arkansas alignment, and the Arkansas Delta on the eastern half of the state.

History
Several bypasses have been built since the original 1926 routing following the growth of the cities it passes through.
 Garland was bypassed in the 1980s by a new bridge over the Red River; the western part of old Highway 2 (from modern U.S. 82 into Garland) is now Highway 134.
 North of Garland, an S-shaped section of the highway was replaced with a new alignment in 1948, smoothing out the sharp curves.  The old alignment, now part of County Roads 122 and 123, and one of the drivable sections of AR 2's original pavement, was listed on the National Register of Historic Places as "Old Arkansas 2-Mayton Segment" in 2008.
 East of Lake Village, U.S. 82 (Highway 2) turned northeast along Lake Chicot to the old ferry crossing near Greenville, Mississippi; that alignment is now Highway 144 from Lake Village past Lake Chicot State Park to its end at the Mississippi River levee.  U.S. 82 was rerouted south of Lake Chicot when the Benjamin G. Humphreys Bridge opened in 1940, and retained most of that alignment for the current Greenville Bridge.

Major intersections

See also

 Red River Bridge (Arkansas)
 National Register of Historic Places listings in Miller County, Arkansas

References

External links

002
Arkansas 002
Roads on the National Register of Historic Places in Arkansas
Transportation in Miller County, Arkansas
Transportation in Lafayette County, Arkansas
Transportation in Columbia County, Arkansas
Transportation in Union County, Arkansas
Transportation in Ashley County, Arkansas
Transportation in Chicot County, Arkansas
Texarkana metropolitan area
National Register of Historic Places in Miller County, Arkansas